Franz Riegler may refer to:

 Franz Riegler (footballer, born 1915) (known as Bobby; 1915–1989), Austrian international footballer
 Franz Riegler (footballer, born 1922) (known as Franz Riegler II; 1922–1945), Austrian footballer who represented Germany internationally

See also
 Rigler